| nationality     = American
| birth_date      = 
| birth_place     = Kamuela, Hawaii, US

Torazo Ryusaki held black belts in both Kodokan Judo and Shotokan Karate, and made it mandatory that all of his sons train in two styles of Martial Arts.

Bill Ryusaki trained in Shotokan Karate and Judo while his brothers trained in Kendo, Aikido, and Judo. Bill's older brothers would often use him as their practice dummy. At 19 years old, Ryusaki went to study at the University of Hawaii. He soon started training in Kenpo privately with Marino Tiwanak (a famous Hawaiian Boxer).

Military career
Ryusaki was drafted into the U.S. Army and made his way to the Fort Ord military base in California. He was originally a military range finder, until a high-ranking officer got word of Ryusaki's martial art skills because of a fight that broke out on base. He then became advanced infantry where he taught hand-to-hand combat at Fort Benning, Georgia.

Professional life
Ryusaki returned to California, where Marino Tiwanak told him to meet Ed Parker (American Kenpo).  Ryusaki and Parker trained together and became pioneers of Kenpo Karate on the mainland of the United States. Parker asked Ryusaki to help with John Leoning and actor Poncie Ponce's dojo. In 1962 Ryusaki opened his own dojo combining his unique style of Judo, Jujitsu, Shotokan, Kenpo, and Aikido to become the founder of Ryu Dojo, Hawaiian Kenpo. He dedicated his school to his father, Torazo, to show his love and appreciation for all that is father had taught him. GM Ryusaki holds a tenth degree (Ju-Dan) in Hawaiian Kenpo and, a seventh-degree in Judo, as well as black belts in Shotokan and Aikido. Ryusaki has trained thousands of students including Dan Guzman, Erick Schumann and family, Otto Estuardo Schumman , Benny "The Jet", Arnold Urquidez Sr., and Cecil Peoples, and actor Bryan Becker. 

Fox of Peace dojo  and Kitsune Kenpo Ju-Jitsu was created at Bill Ryusaki's request, by one of his loyal students David Becker. 

Ryusaki became successful in the entertainment industry as an actor and stuntman.

Ryusaki was inducted into the Martial Arts History Museum's Hall of Fame in 2003.

Personal life
Ryusaki is the father of actress/stuntwoman Kimberly Ryusaki and stuntman Ryan Ryusaki.

Partial filmography 
The Wrecking Crew (1968) - Henri (uncredited)
Force: Five (1981)
Some Kind of Hero (1982) - Basketball Player
Blue Thunder (1983) - Vietcong Soldier
Police Academy 2: Their First Assignment (1985) - Street Punk #2 (uncredited)
Big Trouble in Little China (1986) - Wing Kong Hatchet Man
Number One with a Bullet (1987) - Tai Chi teacher
Cage (1989) - Chinese Guard #1
RoboCop 2 (1990) - Cain's Gang Squad (uncredited)
Come See the Paradise (1990) - Issei Gentleman
Leather Jackets (1992) - Prath
Ulterior Motives (1992) - Yakuza #1
Point of No Return (1993) - Karate Instructor
Deadly Target (1994) - Zhou
Being John Malkovich (1999) - Mr. Hiroshi
Price of Glory (2000) - Silver Gloves Official
Revolve (2012) - David's Epitome and Obstacle 'F'

References 

Living people
1936 births
People from Hawaii
Martial arts school founders
American martial artists